Bogdănești is a commune located in Suceava County, Romania. It is composed of a single village, Bogdănești.

Natives
 Nicolae Alevra

References

Communes in Suceava County
Localities in Western Moldavia